The Norfolk Board of Education (NBE) is a former school district in Norfolk County, Ontario, which merged into the Grand Erie District School Board (known as English-language Public District School Board No. 23 until the 1999–2000 school year).

This defunct school board building is located in the hamlet of Hillcrest, Ontario, Canada on 173 Hillcrest Road South. Government cutbacks eventually forced the school board to amalgamate with the Haldimand Board of Education and the Brant District Board of Education in 1996.

Schools served

Elementary
Bloomsburg Public School*
Boston Public School*
Courtland Public School*
Delhi Public School*
Doan's Hollow Public School
Doverwood Public School
Elgin Avenue Public School*
Houghton Public School*
Langton Public School*
Nixon Public School
North Public School
Port Dover Public School
Port Rowan Public School*
Port Ryerse School
Simcoe Lions School
South Public School
Teeterville Public School
Townsend Central Public School
Walsingham Public School
Walsh Public School* (originally known as Walsh Area Public School)
Waterford Public School - Ada B. Massecar Campus, (W.F. Hewitt Campus closed)
West Lynn Public School*
* signifies that the school is still active

Secondary
Delhi District Secondary School
Simcoe Composite School
Valley Heights Secondary School
Waterford District High School
Port Dover Composite School (no longer active)

Defunct schools

Doan's Hollow Public School

Doan's Hollow Public School is a defunct public elementary school that existed from the early 20th century until circa 1980.

Lynedoch Public School
Lynedoch Public School is a defunct elementary school in the hamlet of Lynedoch, Ontario, Canada which taught students from kindergarten to the second grade starting in the year 1881. This school was considered to be a feeder school to Walsh Public School.

Nixon Public School

Nixon Public School was an elementary school that was located in Nixon. that started out as a one room schoolhouse in the mid to late 19th century. During the 1950s, the school was moved to a centralized building; both of these buildings were located in the hamlet of Nixon and across the street from each other.

The one-room schoolhouse was sold to become a private residence, and Nixon Public School became a centralized school until it was closed in September 2001 due to cutbacks in education spending. After the property was put up for sale by the Grand Erie District School Board and turned down by the Brant Haldimand Norfolk Catholic District School Board, a private agriculture-related business purchased the building from the school board. The former public school was later converted into a craft brewery and pub. "New Limburg" Brewery is owned and operated by a family from the Netherlands, who brew several different Belgian-style beers. They are open daily until 11 pm for samples and sales. http://newlimburg.com/  <ref>[http://www.simcoereformer.ca/2014/04/09/microbrewery-coming-to-nixon Microbrewery Coming to Nixon]  at The Simcoe Reformer</ref> Norfolk County council personally had to approve the land's zoning change from educational to light industrial in order for Norfolk County's third microbrewery to be possible according to their set of by-laws.

North Public School
North Public School is a defunct elementary school in Simcoe, Ontario, Canada that taught children from Kindergarten to sixth grade. This school was once considered a feeder school to Elgin Avenue Public School. The school had a VIP program that consisted of the "graduating class." Amongst the young boys, the schoolyard consisted of three different seasonal games, the most popular of which was the winter game appropriately named "Kings of the Ice".  This game was named after the Nintendo game Kings of the Beach in the winter of 1990.  The game would take place on a massive patch of ice behind the portable caused by the  weather that North Public School had during the winter months.

Port Dover Composite SchoolPort Dover Composite School (PDCS) was a public middle and high school located in Port Dover, Ontario, Canada. Shortly after closure, PDCS was converted into an elementary school called Lakewood Public School in an attempt to attract the children of New Canadians to the area. Students here typically lived south of Simcoe, northeast of Turkey Point and southwest of Jarvis.

PDCS had a well-established theatre arts program which allowed students to take drama in Grades 9 and 10 and then go on to the unique Theatre Co-op Program. This program ran at the community's Lighthouse Festival Theatre and each year culminated in a class-directed and produced production. In 2011, the class performed the play Sticks and Stones. In addition to its drama classes, the school has a long tradition of excellence at the prestigious Sears Drama Festival. In 2010, the school's production of The Insanity of Mary Girard was one of three plays from the district festival at the Lighthouse Theatre to go on to the regional festival in Hamilton. In 2011 the school's play The Chronicles of Jane, Book Seven was also selected to represent the district at the regional festival, again held in Hamilton.

Port Dover Composite School was originally given the option of remaining open until September 2013; although it has been officially declared that this school will be closed by January 31, 2013. Students who have not already transferred to Simcoe Composite School had to become permanent students there for the duration of their high school "career." Several small groups of Port Dover Composite School students had taken small tours around the Simcoe Composite School campus on November 29, 2012, in order to start the transition from into a high school outside their own community.

Had the traditional Norfolk County high school boundaries been strictly enforced as it been in the past, the students would have filled 78% of the school's total capacity. The worst possible outcome for PDCS coming into the 2012–13 school year was to have classes until the end of January 2013 with each class having less than six students attending, before closing the high school permanently. This has already been achieved despite adding wi-fi Internet access and Smart Boards in an attempt to lure more teenagers into attending PDCS. Most of the students who have attended Port Dover Composite School in the previous (2011–12) school year have left in a sudden "exodus" to attend Simcoe Composite School in the search of better school programs. Only 14 teachers have remained at the high school as of the beginning of the 2012–13 school year.

In addition, almost all athletic teams have been eliminated in favor of a strictly academic approach to schooling. Traditional favorites like high school football and basketball have been scrapped; with a bye given to opponents who were supposed to play against PDCS this year due to a lack of manpower needed to operate a football or girls' basketball team. Some of the less demanding sports like volleyball (for grades 11 and 12) had been given the authorization to compete by the school's athletics department; with 25% of the students on the team. Absenteeism was virtually non-existent in the final year of school operations.

Due to a declining youth population in the Port Dover area, the school was officially closed on January 31, 2013. Compared to 2001, there are 1800 fewer children and young people living in the vicinity of Port Dover Public School. Academic programs in Valley Heights Secondary School and Delhi District Secondary School have been beefed up; hoping to attract former PDCS students to those schools.

Port Ryerse SchoolPort Ryerse School is a defunct elementary school that was located in Port Ryerse. The school operated from the year 1830 until the 1950s when it was finally closed by the Norfolk Board of Education due to funding issues. Both Caucasian and African-Canadian students were photographed attending the school in the year 1898.

Simcoe Lions School
The Simcoe Lions School was operated as a special elementary school for the mentally challenged by the Simcoe Lions Club from 1957 until the 1970s. Graduates from the Simcoe Lions School were denied most of their civil rights until the year 1988 when the mentally challenged people received the right to vote in municipal, provincial, and federal elections. Many great teachers and principals have inspired students to become members of the Norfolk Association for Community Living (NACL). While they spend their time and effort being members of this program, the former students have been known to perform simple tasks of labor at ABEL Enterprises in order to earn money. This encourages them to earn their own money instead of turning to their caregivers or the government for income. Some of the older students who once attended Simcoe Lions School are currently learning new life skills at a group home for the elderly. Prior to 2009, some graduates that were unfortunate enough to be in an institution saw what was supposed to be their "long care facility" shut down on April 1, 2009.

South Public SchoolSouth Public School is also a defunct elementary school in Simcoe, Ontario, Canada.

St. Williams Public SchoolSt. Williams Public School'' is a defunct elementary school that was located in St. Williams, Ontario, Canada. It was closed due to funding cutbacks and declining enrolment in the year 2001 after participating in the Ice Cube project.

References

External links

 Norfolk Board of Education (Archive)

Educational institutions disestablished in 1996
Education in Norfolk County, Ontario
Former school districts in Ontario
1996 disestablishments in Ontario